The 1970 Individual Ice Speedway World Championship was the fifth edition of the World Championship.

The winner was Antonín Šváb Sr. of the Czechoslovakia.

Final 
 March 8
  Nassjo

References

Ice speedway competitions
Ice